Botulu (Bootulu) is a rural locality (a selo), the administrative centre of and one of two settlements, in addition to Kyotyordyokh, in Botulunsky Rural Okrug of Verkhnevilyuysky District in the Sakha Republic, Russia. Its population as of the 2010 Census was 815; down from 860 recorded in the 2002 Census.

References

Notes

Sources
Official website of the Sakha Republic. Registry of the Administrative-Territorial Divisions of the Sakha Republic. Verkhnevilyuysky District. 

Rural localities in Verkhnevilyuysky District